Irina Velihanova (born 17 March 1996) is a Turkmenistan track and field athlete. In 2019, she competed in the women's 100 metres hurdles event at the 2019 World Athletics Championships held in Doha, Qatar. She did not qualify to compete in the semi-finals.

In 2018, she won the bronze medal in the women's pentathlon event at the 2018 Asian Indoor Athletics Championships held in Tehran, Iran.

In 2019, she competed in the women's heptathlon event at the 2019 Asian Athletics Championships held in Doha, Qatar.

References

External links 
 

Living people
1996 births
Place of birth missing (living people)
Turkmenistan female athletes
World Athletics Championships athletes for Turkmenistan
20th-century Turkmenistan women
21st-century Turkmenistan women